Achnacroish is a hamlet on the Scottish island of Lismore. The harbour serves the ferry between Lismore and Oban.

The hamlet has the island's primary school. A heritage centre and a church are within walking distance. The church is remarkable as it stands on the same spot as a cathedral that was the home of the Bishop of Argyll from the year 1200.

References

External links
 

Villages in Argyll and Bute
Lismore, Scotland
Villages in the Inner Hebrides